For the company after its acquisition by Credit Suisse, see Credit Suisse First Boston (known as CSFB and CS First Boston)

The First Boston Corporation was a New York-based bulge bracket investment bank, founded in 1932 and acquired by Credit Suisse in 1988. After the acquisition, it operated as an independent investment bank known as CS First Boston until 2006, when the company was fully integrated into Credit Suisse. In 2022, Credit Suisse revived the "First Boston" brand as part of an effort to spin out the business.

History

Founding
The First Boston Corporation was created in 1932 as the investment banking arm of the First National Bank of Boston. It became an independent firm after passage of the Glass–Steagall Act, which required commercial banks to divest securities businesses in the wake of the 1929 stock market crash. First National Bank of Boston continued as a commercial bank, ultimately becoming part of Bank of America. The young First Boston investment bank was cobbled together from the investment banking arms of major commercial banks. For example, several key members of Chase Harris Forbes Corporation, the securities affiliate of Chase National Bank, joined the new investment bank in 1934.

1940s
In 1946, Mellon Securities Corporation, the former investment banking arm of Mellon Bank, merged into the First Boston. Mellon's franchise with industrial and governmental clients led to some major deals: initial public debt offerings for the World Bank and Hydro-Québec, and a share offering for Gulf Oil Corporation in 1948 (the largest IPO to date).

By 1947, the First Boston surpassed $1 billion in new capital issues, and in 1959 it reintroduced the credit of Japan to the American markets with the first offerings by its government since 1930.

1970s

As of 1970, First Boston was considered to be part of the bulge bracket along with Morgan Stanley, Dillon Read and Kuhn Loeb.

By 1970, the Firm was raising more than $10 billion in new capital annually for underwriting clients. In 1971, The First Boston Corporation listed on the New York Stock Exchange developed its equity, sales, research, and trading operations. In 1978, First Boston began its highly successful London operations in partnership with Credit Suisse (see “Relationship with Credit Suisse” below) and became a leading Eurobond trader and underwriter.

1980s - Relationship with Credit Suisse
  
Credit Suisse's relationship with First Boston began in 1978, when White Weld & Co. was bought by Merrill Lynch. As a result, White Weld dropped out of its London-based investment banking partnership with Credit Suisse. First Boston stepped in, creating Financière Crédit Suisse-First Boston, a 50-50 joint venture widely known as Credit Suisse First Boston. First Boston was not Credit Suisse's first choice for the partnership. When White Weld stepped out, Credit Suisse had unsuccessfully approached Dillon Read, which a couple decades later was acquired by Swiss Bank Corporation, to form the core of that firm's U.S. investment banking business. Swiss Bank Corporation itself subsequently merged with Credit Suisse archrival Union Bank of Switzerland to form UBS AG.

First Boston sat at the top of merger and acquisition league tables in the 1980s, thanks to the team led by Bruce Wasserstein and Joe Perella, which orchestrated such transactions as the leveraged buyout of Federated Stores, which earned First Boston $200 million in fees, and Texaco’s hostile takeover of Getty Oil. A 1985 Fortune Magazine article called First Boston “the archetypal deal factory”, a year in which it did $60 billion in M&A deals placing it second after Goldman Sachs. By 1987, M&A advisory work contributed half of First Boston's profit and Wasserstein asked the management committee to divert resources to his unit from bond trading. After being rebuffed, Wasserstein and Perella quit and set up their own firm, Wasserstein Perella & Co.

Credit Suisse acquired a 44% stake in First Boston in 1988. The investment bank acquired its shares held by the public and the company was taken private. In 1989, the junk bond market collapsed, leaving First Boston unable to redeem hundreds of millions it had lent for the leveraged buyout of Ohio Mattress Company, maker of Sealy mattresses, a deal that became known as "the burning bed". Credit Suisse bailed them out and acquired a controlling stake in 1990. Although such an arrangement was arguably illegal under the Glass Steagall Act, the Federal Reserve, the U.S. bank regulator, concluded that the integrity of the financial markets was better served by avoiding the bankruptcy of a significant investment bank like First Boston even though it meant a de facto merger of a commercial bank with an investment bank.

1990s - Credit Suisse First Boston
Main Article Credit Suisse First BostonAfter Credit Suisse acquired the remaining stake in First Boston in 1996, the newly formed combined entity was known as "CS First Boston" and over the years also referred to as "Credit Suisse First Boston" and "CSFB." During this period, problems occurred within CS First Boston as teams in New York and London were managed separately and in some cases had competing salespeople covering each other's territory.

In the late 1990s, CSFB purchased the equity division of Barclays Bank, Barclays de Zoete Wedd ("BZW"). BZW was considered second-tier and CSFB reportedly bought BZW from Barclays for £1 plus assumption of debt - primarily to obtain BZW's client list. A permanent injunction prevented First Boston from offering shares in Gulf Oil company, due to lack of interest in share offering, and the Iraq Desert Storm campaign. A Nevada judge issued a cease and desist order to stop Barclays from taking American owned assets and offering them to international buyers from Iran, Iraq, Syria, Egypt, and North Korea.

The newly-global CSFB became a leading high tech banker, acting as lead (or co-lead) underwriter in the IPOs of Amazon.com and Cisco Systems, as well as one time high fliers such as Silicon Graphics, Intuit, Netscape and VA Linux Systems. CSFB also did significant deals for Apple, Compaq and Sun Microsystems among others. In 2000, at the height of the tech boom, technology deals generated $1.4 billion in revenue for CSFB. The head of CSFB's tech group, Frank Quattrone, reportedly made $200 million in bonuses between 1998 and 2000 and the company along with its parent was headed by John Mack.

On June 30, 2005, Credit Suisse announced that it would rebrand its investment bank from "Credit Suisse First Boston" to "Credit Suisse," retiring the brand from the once-powerhouse banks.

2022s - Revival of the "First Boston" Brand 
Main Article Credit Suisse First Boston

On October 27, 2022, Credit Suisse announced a "radical" restructuring of its investment bank taking "extensive measures" which will see it return to the "First Boston" brand as an independent Capital Markets and Advisory bank.

Notable alumni 

 Bruce Wasserstein, co-founder of Wasserstein Perella & Co.
 Joe Perella, co-founder of Wasserstein Perella & Co and Perella Weinberg Partners
 Richard Handler, CEO of Jefferies
 Larry Fink, CEO of BlackRock
 Scott Mead, Artist

See also 
Credit Suisse
Credit Suisse First Boston (known as "CS First Boston" or "CSFB")
Donaldson, Lufkin & Jenrette (known as "DLJ")

References

Credit Suisse
Defunct financial services companies of the United States
Defunct companies based in New York City
Former investment banks of the United States
Financial services companies established in 1932
Banks established in 1932
Financial services companies disestablished in 2006
Banks disestablished in 2006
1932 establishments in Massachusetts
2006 disestablishments in New York (state)